italki is an online language learning platform which connects language learners and teachers through video chat. The site allows students to find online teachers for 1-on-1 tutoring, and teachers to earn money as freelance tutors. italki is headquartered in Hong Kong, China.

One can choose online language lessons taught by a professional teacher, who provides structured learning plans, or a community tutor. Students may also use it as a platform for mutual language exchange.

History

In 2007, Kevin Chen and Yongyue Jiang cofounded italki as an online language exchange community.  At the start, the site was focused on building free features for the community.
In 2009, the site launched its teacher marketplace, allowing teachers to earn money by providing online tutoring services. Teachers on italki set their own price and time schedule.

In 2012, italki raised angel funding from independent investors. In 2016, italki raised $3 million from Hujiang, a Baidu-invested Chinese education company with over 100 million users.

As of July 2017, italki has more than 3 million users from more than 100 countries, and 5000 teachers. English is the most popular language being studied, followed by Spanish, French, Chinese, and Japanese.  The site offers more than 100 languages for students and teachers to choose from Its user interface supports 19 languages.

See also
 Language education
 Online education
 Community language learning
 Online platforms for collaborative consumption

References

External links
 italki official website

Chinese educational websites
Language education
Language exchange programs
Internet properties established in 2007